Leon Davidson (October 18, 1922 – January 1, 2007) was an American chemical engineer and scientist, one of the team that developed the atomic bomb.

Education and early career
A native of New York City, Davidson received his B.S. (1943), M.S. (1947) and Ph.D. (1951) in chemical engineering from Columbia University's School of Engineering and Applied Science. He had selected this career at the age of 13 while studying at Stuyvesant High School. During his graduate studies, he was personally selected by future SEAS dean John R. Dunning to join the Manhattan Project, the US atomic bomb development program. After an assignment at the Oak Ridge National Laboratory in Tennessee, he moved his family to Los Alamos, New Mexico, where he eventually became an engineering design supervisor for one of the atomic weapons then under development. He then accepted assignments at the Atomic Energy Commission and the Department of Defense at The Pentagon before moving into the private sector.

Postwar career
In the mid-1950s, he joined the Nuclear Development Corporation of America in White Plains, New York, entering the emerging field of computer technology and development. Following stints in management at several large technology companies including Union Carbide, Teleregister, Western Union, General Precision Laboratories, and IBM (where he was Manager of  Advanced Applications Development), he became an independent consultant, working for both government clients including Oak Ridge National Laboratories and commercial clients including Mini-Computer Systems of Elmsford, New York.

On the side, he formed his own technology consulting and design company (Metroprocessing Corporation of America) to explore and exploit the emerging technology of touch-tone dialing (now used for push-button telephones). His goal was to make Metroprocessing the single source of information on the application of the twelve button touch tone telephone to private companies and public agencies.

Personal life
In the mid-to-late 1950s, Davidson volunteered at the Civil Defense Filter Center in White Plains, helping track and identify aircraft flying over the New York metropolitan area. He devoted much of his free time to the study of Unidentified Flying Objects (UFOs). He convinced a Congressional committee to force the Air Force to permit him to publish and distribute, in its entirety, the Air Force's Project Blue Book Special Report No. 14, the primary source book on the Air Force's findings related to UFOs.

Davidson firmly believed that the objects reported to be extraterrestrial spacecraft were, in fact, experimental aircraft developed by the Air Force or CIA. On June 29, 2018, Davidson's son, Edward Davidson, found an article  containing a photograph clearly showing two "saucers" in front of a hangar and surrounded by workers, two small planes and a few trucks. In the photo, the left side of the smaller "saucer" is clearly marked "USAF". The larger "saucer" has what appears to be "USAF" also but is not as clearly visible.

An avid thinker, Davidson spent many hours analyzing major national and world events, including the Kennedy assassination, questionable Presidential elections and the Jonestown massacre.

Davidson died in White Plains Hospital on January 1, 2007. His ashes are buried in White Plains, New York, He was survived by his wife, Doris, his three children (Ed, Carole, and Martha), his two granddaughters (Leah and Rachel), and his three great-grandsons (Alex, Wesley, and Nathan) and great-granddaughter (Maddie).

References

External links
http://www.college.columbia.edu/cct_archive/may_jun07/obituaries.html

1922 births
2007 deaths
Manhattan Project people
Columbia School of Engineering and Applied Science alumni
People from White Plains, New York
Los Alamos National Laboratory personnel